Vendetta is the second album by rapper Mic Geronimo, released on November 4, 1997 through TVT Records.

The album featured production from a wide range of hip hop producers including legends like Marley Marl and Pete Rock. It was an improvement on the Billboard charts over his previous album, peaking at number 112 on the Billboard 200 and number 20 on the Top R&B/Hip-Hop Albums chart. The album also featured his only Billboard Hot 100 hit, "Nothin' Move But the Money", which managed to find minor-success and peaked at number 70 on the chart. The album is now out of print.

There is a version of "Usual Suspects" which features Hussein Fatal in place of Tragedy Khadafi and The Lox. It is uncertain which version of the song is the original.

Critical reception

AllMusic's Leo Stanley was critical of the Puff Daddy-produced "Nothin' Move But the Money" but gave praise to the "R&B-flavored productions" throughout the album and Geronimo's rhyming abilities that make Vendetta worth listening for people.

Track listing

Samples
Nothin' Move but the Money
"Transformation" by Nona Hendryx
Life N Lessons
"Stop on By" by Rufus & Chaka Khan
For Tha Family
"Pastures" by Ahmad Jamal
Street Life
"Second to None" by Atlantic Starr
"Risin' to the Top" by Keni Burke
Unstoppable
"Poor Abbey Walsh" by Marvin Gaye
"The Champ" by The Mohawks 
"Dizzy" by Hugo Montenegro
Single Life
"Single Life" by Cameo
Things Ain't What They Used to Be
"Touching You" by Stanley Turrentine
"Mercy Mercy Me (The Ecology)" by Marvin Gaye
Usual Suspects
"Mango Meat" by Mandrill
"UFO" by ESG

Charts

References

1997 albums
Mic Geronimo albums
TVT Records albums
Albums produced by K-Def
Albums produced by The Legendary Traxster
Albums produced by Irv Gotti
Albums produced by Pete Rock